Hilde Klusenwerth (15 July 1910 – 2 December 1999) was a German hurdler. She competed in the women's 80 metres hurdles at the 1936 Summer Olympics.

References

1910 births
1999 deaths
Athletes (track and field) at the 1936 Summer Olympics
German female hurdlers
Olympic athletes of Germany
Place of birth missing